Lauren Louise Price  (born 25 June 1994) is a Welsh professional boxer, and former kickboxer and footballer. While representing Wales she won a bronze medal at the 2014 Commonwealth Games, becoming the first Welsh woman to win a Commonwealth Games boxing medal. Four years later she surpassed this achievement by winning gold at the 2018 Commonwealth Games, followed by a gold at the 2019 World Championships. While representing Great Britain, she won gold medals at the 2019 European Games and 2020 Summer Olympics.

Price also played football for several years with Cardiff City, winning the inaugural season of the Welsh Premier Women's Football League in 2013. Having captained Wales at under-19 level, she made her senior debut in 2012. She gave up playing football in 2014 to focus on her boxing career.

Early life
Price was born in Newport, Wales, but grew up in Ystrad Mynach, Caerphilly, where she was brought up by her grandparents. She attended Heolddu Comprehensive School in Bargoed. She showed a keen interest in several sports, taking up football, netball and kickboxing at the age of ten, the last after encouragement from her grandfather. As a kickboxer, Price won a silver medal at a World Championships event in Athens in 2007 at the age of 13, competing against opponents twice her age, and became the youngest ever competitor in the British Championships. She went on to become a four-time world champion and six-time European champion in the sport and later competed in Taekwondo.

Football career

Club
Price was spotted by scouts from Cardiff City. She credited her kickboxing training with helping improve her play, commenting "I could kick a ball a lot further than any of my team mates" and noting that "I might have had a higher pain threshold than everyone else." She was part of the club's under-16 side that won the Welsh section of the Tesco Cup in 2010, being named player of the tournament.

She progressed to the senior team at Cardiff and won the inaugural Welsh Premier Women's Football League title during the 2012–13 season after their decisive 5–2 victory over Wrexham in the final game of the season. Price was named the club's Player of the Year during their title winning season. Price was also named the Football Association of Wales (FAW) Club Player of the Year. In 2014, Price stepped away from football to concentrate on her boxing career ahead of the 2014 Commonwealth Games.

International
Having captained Wales at under-19 level, Price made her debut for the Wales senior side on 16 June 2012, replacing Sarah Wiltshire in the closing stages of a 1–0 victory over Republic of Ireland.

Boxing career
Price initially took up boxing as a teenager but became further involved in the sport after watching British fighter Nicola Adams win gold at the 2012 Summer Olympics in London. After competing in a single amateur bout at 17, she entered the Women's European and Youth World Championships where she claimed a bronze medal. At the 2014 Commonwealth Games, she became the first Welsh woman to claim a boxing medal after defeating Kaye Scott in the quarter-finals of the women's middleweight division to guarantee at least a bronze. She met Ariane Fortin in the semi-final but suffered a split decision defeat.

She claimed another bronze medal at the 2016 Women's European Amateur Boxing Championships. In 2018, she became the first Welsh woman to win a gold medal in boxing after defeating Caitlin Parker via split decision in the final of the event. In May 2019, Price was selected to compete at the 2019 European Games in Minsk, Belarus, winning the gold medal.

Price competed in the 2020 Summer Olympics in Tokyo, beating Dutch boxer Nouchka Fontijn in the middleweight semi-final. She went on to win gold against Li Qian of China. 
Price was appointed Member of the Order of the British Empire (MBE) in the 2022 New Year Honours for services to boxing.

Personal life
Price studied a Foundation Degree in Football Coaching and Development at the University of South Wales. Her partner is featherweight amateur boxer Karriss Artingstall.

Honours
Cardiff City 
 Welsh Premier Women's Football League; 2012–13

Individual 
 FAW Club Player of the Year: 2013

References

External links

1994 births
Living people
AIBA Women's World Boxing Championships medalists
Alumni of the University of South Wales
Boxers at the 2014 Commonwealth Games
Boxers at the 2019 European Games
Boxers at the 2020 Summer Olympics
Cardiff City Ladies F.C. players
Commonwealth Games bronze medallists for Wales
Commonwealth Games medallists in boxing
European Games gold medalists for Great Britain
European Games medalists in boxing
Medalists at the 2020 Summer Olympics
Members of the Order of the British Empire
Middleweight boxers
Olympic boxers of Great Britain
Olympic gold medallists for Great Britain
Olympic medalists in boxing
People educated at Heolddu Comprehensive School
Sportspeople from Caerphilly
Sportspeople from Newport, Wales
Wales women's international footballers
Welsh Olympic medallists
Welsh women boxers
Welsh women's footballers
Women's association football defenders
World middleweight boxing champions
Medallists at the 2014 Commonwealth Games
Medallists at the 2018 Commonwealth Games